In Which Annie Gives it Those Ones is a 1989 Indian English-language TV film written by Arundhati Roy and directed by Pradip Krishen. It stars Arjun Raina as the title character, with Roshan Seth and Arundhati Roy in key roles. The film also features Shahrukh Khan and Manoj Bajpayee, both then struggling actors in the Delhi theatre circuit, in small but significant roles. The film was the recipient of two National Awards in 1989. It acquired a cult status in the years after it was made. The original print of the movie is lost and the only copies of the film in circulation are those that were recorded on Video Cassette Recorder when the film was screened on Doordarshan.

Set in the 1970s, In Which Annie Gives it Those Ones is a comedy that follows a group architecture students in their final year of college.

The film was part autobiographical with Roy recounting her own experiences of studying in the School of Planning and Architecture, Delhi, a leading architecture institute in India.

Plot 
Anand Grover, better known as Annie, is victimized for making fun of his principal, Y. D. Billimoria (popularly known as Yamdoot or Hell's messenger), years ago. At the School of Planning and Architecture, New Delhi, Annie is repeating his fifth year for the fourth time. He spends his hours in the hostel which is the best part of his life, by 'giving it those ones' — indulging in daydreams of social uplift. His latest idea is to plant fruit trees on either side of railway tracks, where rural India defecates daily. The faecal matter will provide the necessary compost for the trees, while the trains, with sprinklers attached, will automatically water the plants.

Annie keeps two hens in his room and earns a modest sum by selling their eggs, until one day his friend, Mankind, and his Ugandan roommate, Kasozi, make a roasted meal out of them. Soon, however, hirsute Arjun and his girlfriend Radha — a non-conformist student who steals cigarettes from Yamdoot and talks back to the teachers — present Annie with a rabbit.

Many adventures later, the day to submit the thesis draws near. Annie, urged by his friends, apologises to Yamdoot. A panel of judges call the students one by one for their final interviews and the tension mounts. Radha goes dressed in a saree but wears a man's hat to detract from her sober attire. To make sure that Annie gets a sympathetic hearing from the hostile panel, Radha and Arjun work out a plan. Just when Annie is called in, Yamdoot receives a phone call from his dominating deep-voiced mother,(who in actuality is Mankind). The trick works and the weary panel gives Annie a good grade.

At the party after the graduation ceremony, Annie arrives with heavy books under his arm, his hair shaved off and a butterfly painted on his head. He informs his friends that he has decided to study law and then sue Yamdoot. But subsequently, Annie became an Associate Professor of Design at the National Institute of Architecture, a year after Yamdoot's retirement.

Cast 

 Arjun Raina as Anand Grover a.k.a. "Annie"
 Arundhati Roy as Radha Singh
 Rituraj Singh as Arjun Kamat
 Roshan Seth as Y. D. Billimoria (Yamdoot)
 Isaac Thomas as Mankind
 Divya Seth as Lakes
 Idries Malik as Papey
 Moses Uboh as Kasozi
 Jagan Shah as Medoo
 Himani Shivpuri as Bijli
 Shahrukh Khan as Senior
 Niraj Shah as a Canteen Boy
 Shantanu Nagpal as Allaudin
 Dhianee Ji as a Canteen Boy
 Manoj Bajpayee as a Student
 Raghuvir Yadav as Eve Teaser
 Sitaram Panchal as Police Officer

Awards

References

External links

1989 television films
1989 films
Doordarshan television films
English-language Indian films
Films set in Delhi
Films set in the 1970s
Indian comedy films
School of Planning and Architecture
Films whose writer won the Best Original Screenplay National Film Award
Best English Feature Film National Film Award winners
Films directed by Pradip Krishen
1980s English-language films